Glyphic may refer to:

 "Glyphic" (The Outer Limits), a 1998 episode of TV series The Outer Limits 
 Glyphic (album), a 2007 album by Boxcutter